Bernard Mutale is a Zambian football defender who played for Zambia in the 1978 African Cup of Nations. He played club football for Red Arrows.

References

External links

11v11 Profile

Zambian footballers
Zambia international footballers
1978 African Cup of Nations players
Olympic footballers of Zambia
Footballers at the 1980 Summer Olympics
Year of birth missing (living people)
Place of birth missing (living people)
Living people
Association football defenders